Septoria humuli is a fungal plant pathogen infecting the hop plant.

References

External links
 Index Fungorum
 USDA ARS Fungal Database

humuli
Fungal plant pathogens and diseases
Food plant pathogens and diseases
Fungi described in 1854
Hop diseases